The Diamond Queen may refer to:
 The Diamond Queen (1921 film)
 Diamond Queen (1940 film)
 The Diamond Queen (1953 film)
 The Diamond Queen (TV programme)

See also
 Queen of Diamonds (disambiguation)